Apache Junction High School is a high school in Apache Junction, Arizona under the jurisdiction of the Apache Junction Unified School District.

Notable alumni
 Elaine Herzberg – First pedestrian killed by a self-driving car

References

Public high schools in Arizona
Schools in Pinal County, Arizona